The fifteenth season of the One Piece anime series was produced by Toei Animation, and directed by Hiroaki Miyamoto. The season was broadcast in Japan on Fuji Television on October 2, 2011 to December 23, 2012. Like the rest of the series, it follows the adventures of Monkey D. Luffy and his Straw Hat Pirates. The first of fourteen DVD compilations was released on December 5, 2012, and the last one was released on December 3, 2013.

The main story arc, called , adapts material from the 61st to the end of the 66th volumes of the manga by Eiichiro Oda. Two years have passed since the war at Marineford, and Luffy regroups with the Straw Hats reunite at Sabaody after completing their training sessions. From there, they head off to Fishman Island. However, they end up facing Hordy Jones who plots to use a coup d'état to take control of Fishman Island. The final four episodes contain an original story arc, which serves as a prologue to the concurrently released One Piece Film: Z.

Only a single piece of theme music is used for this season. The opening theme, titled , is performed by Hiroshi Kitadani.



Episode list

Home releases

Japanese

English
In North America, the majority of the season was recategorized as "Season Nine" for its DVD release by Funimation Entertainment. The Australian Season Nine sets were renamed Collection 43 through 47.

Notes

References
General

Specific

One Piece seasons
2011 Japanese television seasons
2012 Japanese television seasons
One Piece episodes